Buenaventura Codina y Augerolas (3 June 1788 – 18 November 1857) was a Spanish prelate of the Catholic Church who served as Bishop of Canarias which covers the islands of Fuerteventura, Gran Canaria and Lanzarote in the Canary Islands.

Biography
Born in Hostalric in 1788, Codina was ordained a priest in 1810 and was appointed Bishop of Canarias in 1847 by Pope Pius IX, A position he held until his death in 1857.

In 1978 his body was exhumed from the crypt of the Cathedral of Santa Ana and was found to be in an incorrupt state, and is now on display in the Chapel of Our Lady of Los Dolores.  He was declared a Servant of God and his case for beatification continues.

See also
 Diocese of Tenerife

References

Spanish Roman Catholic bishops
Spanish Servants of God
Bishops appointed by Pope Pius IX
1788 births
1857 deaths